Get Real is an American comedy-drama series that aired on the Fox Network and ran from September 1999 to April 2000. It follows the fictional Green family headed by parents Mitch and Mary and consisting of three teenagers—Meghan, Cameron, and Kenny. It stars Eric Christian Olsen, Jesse Eisenberg, Anne Hathaway, Debrah Farentino, and Jon Tenney. The series marked both Hathaway and Eisenberg's onscreen debuts. Hathaway and Olsen portrayed the older siblings to Eisenberg’s central character.

Premise 
The series follows the dysfunctional Green family. Parents Mitch and Mary, who first became parents when they were teenagers, find their marriage has hit the skids. Oldest child Meghan is an achiever who is nominated for class valedictorian and is accepted to UC Berkeley, but she drops a bombshell on her parents when she announces she is foregoing college. Middle child Cameron is a slacker who upsets his mom by bringing girls to stay over for the night. Youngest child Kenny is awkward and a target of bullies. Living with the Greens is Mary’s mom Elizabeth, who has taken up residence in their home after the death of her husband.

The Green kids periodically address the camera, a technique show creator Clyde Phillips employed in his previous teen series Parker Lewis Can't Lose. These asides to the audience are sometimes delivered in a sarcastic tone that references popular culture and other TV shows. In the pilot, Meghan comments to the audience, "I know what you're thinking. 'This is another one of those smart-ass shows where the kids talk to the audience' like on um, Dawson’s Creek, which, actually come to think of it, I'm not even sure does voice-overs. See, personally I wouldn't be caught dead watching it because there is nothing more obnoxious than self-aware teens who know more about life's great mysteries than their parents. And don't worry, we're not gonna get all sturmy-eyed either like on My So-Called Life. Although, you know, that chick didn't do so bad for herself."

Cast
 Jon Tenney as Mitch Green
 Debrah Farentino as Mary Green
 Eric Christian Olsen as Cameron Green
 Anne Hathaway as Meghan Green
 Jesse Eisenberg as Kenny Green
 Natalie Ramsey as Jennell Hutchison
 Scott Vickaryous as Clay Forman
 Christina Pickles as Elizabeth Parker

Episodes

Reception 
Ray Richmond of Variety reviewed the show positively, saying "it manages to feel sassy, hip and provocative" and "[carries]...sophistication, angst and wit while adding a healthy dash of self-aware irony to the stew." Of the pilot, he added, "[Clyde] Phillips and [Scott] Winant dare viewers to dismiss their show as so much hypersensitive blather, using the characters to satirize the show’s zeitgeist via the script’s liberal pop-culture referencing", and that "what saves the production as a whole, is its giddy irreverence and sharp observations about the ways that family members at different stages of life endure their distinctive brands of hell."

The Star Tribune also gave a positive review, noting "The narration and pop-culture asides are fast, loose, and often very funny, especially when delivered by the sarcastic Jesse Eisenberg, who reacts to bullies and his parents' marital troubles with hilarious nerd-in-the-headlights takes." The Bangor Daily News praised the cast, with critic Dale McGarrigle saying "Somehow, Phillips and a fine cast of actors make 'Get Real' work, despite" its mesh of various genres including "observational comedy, the next relationship melodrama, [and] the next life-or-death suspense."

Kay McFadden of The Seattle Times called Get Real  “self-conscious and smirky,” saying it "fails to distinguish itself from the herd of like-minded shows this fall." Kinney Littlefield of the Orange County Register criticized the show, calling it a “teen-targeted sketch comedy, stuffed with quick visual schtick, shock-inducing dialogue, and facile, wink-wink, ain’t-we-bad digs at other fave teen shows.” Hal Boedeker of the Orlando Sentinel wrote the show’s style “is comical, smart-aleck, [and] cynical”, but its “emotional force is blunted by fantasy scenes, glib dialogue and constant references to other TV series.” He also criticized the show’s tone as ”veering from sophomoric sex comedy to wrenching drama” in a “baffling” fashion.

The series aired in a competitive Wednesday night time slot, going up against the debut of NBC's The West Wing and The WB's teen drama Roswell. It struggled ratings-wise and was eventually cancelled in the spring of 2000, before its final two episodes could be aired.

References

External links

1999 American television series debuts
2000 American television series endings
Fox Broadcasting Company original programming
Television shows filmed in Los Angeles
Television series by 20th Century Fox Television
Television series about dysfunctional families
1990s American comedy-drama television series
1990s American teen drama television series
2000s American teen drama television series
2000s American comedy-drama television series
Coming-of-age television shows
Television series about siblings